Fatako  is a town and sub-prefecture in the Tougué Prefecture in the Fouta Region of northern-central Guinea.

Fatako has one of the biggest mosque in guinea.

References

Sub-prefectures of the Labé Region